Imagine, the Sky, is a 2011 Swiss-Sierra Leonean documentary drama film directed and produced by Brigitte Kornetzky for MagpieDream Pictures as an independent film. The film stars Matilda Bangs in lead role along with Hawa Momoh, John Mangura, Mussu Suray, Regina Sesay and John George.

The documentary deals with life of pupils at the Milton Margai School for the Blind in Freetown, Sierra Leone, West Africa. In the film, she took part in seven different roles other than director: producer, editor, writer, cinematographer, sound editor, art director and composer. During the making of documentary, she helped the people in Sierra Leone through her co-founded organization: 'A Grain of Change'. The film had its premier on 31 January 2011 at 40th Rotterdam International Film Festival. The film received critical acclaim and screened at several film festivals including, 27th Warsaw Film Festival and International Human Rights Festival in Albania.

The film was distributed worldwide by MagpieDream Pictures.

Plot

Cast
 Matilda Bangs
 Hawa Momoh
 John Mangura
 Mussu Suray
 Regina Sesay
 John George

References

External links
 
 Imagine, the Sky on YouTube

2011 films
Swiss documentary films
Sierra Leonean documentary films
2010s English-language films